Henrich Aleksandrovich Mayorov (6 September 1936 – 3 April 2022) was a Russian-Ukrainian choreographer and ballet dancer. He died on 3 April 2022.

References

1936 births
2022 deaths
Soviet male ballet dancers
Russian male ballet dancers
Ukrainian male ballet dancers
Russian choreographers
Ukrainian people of Russian descent
Saint Petersburg Conservatory alumni
People from Ulan-Ude
Recipients of the USSR State Prize